The Draft Mark Warner for President committee was an effort to promote the candidacy of former Governor of Virginia Mark Warner. It was founded the day after the 2004 presidential election by Democratic Party activist Eddie Ratliff of Virginia. On October 23, 2007, the Draft Warner for President Committee received a letter from the Federal Elections Commission (FEC) in response to the committee's declaration of intent to cease operations, dated October 2, 2007, and was allowed to terminate its affairs and cease filing with the FEC. Warner had  announced his intent to become a Senate candidate prior to the committee's letter to the FEC.

History
Ratliff created the 2004 Virginia for Wesley Clark network and was a lead organizer for Clark's Virginia ballot initiative. Clark was the last to enter the democratic primary in Virginia and the first on the ballot. Soon after the website, https://web.archive.org/web/20060706010552/http://www.draftmarkwarner.com/ was created, Ratliff was joined by Steve Deak and Eddie Hartman who were also initial co-founders of the draft movement. Steve Deak was a Loudoun County Democratic Party Chair and County Coordinator for Governor Warner's 2001 campaign, and became the Southern Regional Director for Draft Mark Warner committee. Hartman, a partner at LegalZoom, worked on efforts in Southern California. Delegate Onzlee Ware, of the Virginia House of Delegates and PR professional Mike Smith served as the Official DMW Spokespersons.

After the election of Governor Tim Kaine in November 2005, the committee  had activity in dozens of states, conducting events nationwide. On March 9, 2006, the Draft Mark Warner filed papers with the Federal Elections Commission and officially became the Draft Mark Warner for President PAC. Terry Frye, the Bristol, Virginia Commissioner of Revenue serves as the PAC's Treasurer along with Virginia Democratic Activist Joan Baker Washburn as the Assistant Treasurer.

Draft Mark Warner started its on-the-ground operations at the West Virginia Democratic Party Jefferson-Jackson Dinner on April 27, 2005. Since that time, the group has organized dozens of events nationwide publicizing the candidacy of  Governor Warner and helping to up his name recognition.

When Governor Warner announced his decision to not run in 2008, the Draft committee had state & congressional directors in 39 states, along with affiliated groups such as Young Americans for Warner, Veterans for Warner, and Americans Abroad for Warner.

After becoming a political action committee, Draft Mark Warner raised the funds necessary to conduct events nationwide, attending such events as the National Young Democrats Convention, the National Federation of Democratic Women Convention, the National College Democrats Convention, the first Yearly KOS Convention (Las Vegas), and many others.

The PAC started its fundraising campaign in Virginia, by gaining the endorsements of key business and legislative leaders to serve as Honorary Chairs in each region of the Commonwealth. These key officials lent credibility to the PACs goals and were instrumental in hosting events, raising money, making news, and promoting Governor Warner's run for the White House.

Former State Senator Madison Mayre served as Honorary Chairman of the Draft in Southwest Virginia. Northern Virginia Honorary Chairs included Delegate Brian Moran (46th District), State Senator Richard S, Saslaw (35th District), and State Senator Mary Margaret Whipple (Chair of the Senate Democratic Causus). Richmond businessman and former Delegate R.S. (Major) Reynolds III, State Senator Henry Marsh III, and Delegate Frank Hall were named Honorary Co-Chairs of the greater Richmond Area.  Delegate David E. Poisson served in Central Virginia.

Young Americans for Warner

Young Americans for Mark Warner was established in February 2006, in affiliation with Draft Mark Warner. YAFW kicked off their movement in March 2006 at the North Carolina Young Democrats State Convention, and have been working events like the Young Democrats Conventions, College Democrat Conventions, and other local and statewide Young Democrats events. YAFW currently has coordinators in several states and the movement is growing rapidly. They are also in the process of creating a website https://web.archive.org/web/20070928103341/http://www.yafw.com/, which will be online soon.

New Jersey Democratic activist Marshall Spevak serves as national chairman of YAFW, and is also the founder.

Governor Warner's decision
When Governor Warner decided against seeking the Democratic nomination for president, Draft Mark Warner and Young Americans for Warner kept the PAC active until October 2007, while Governor Warner pondered his political future.

After Governor Warner announced his U.S. Senate run, on the eve of the January 2008 Iowa caucuses, the leadership of the Draft group issued a press release endorsing the presidential candidacy of U.S. Senator Barack Obama. Former key Draft Warner organizers from more than a dozen states began to work to elect Senator Obama.

Draft Mark Warner co-founders Eddie Ratliff and Steve Deak are profiled in author David Meerman Scott's July 2007 book The New Rules of PR & Marketing.  Scott previously profiled Matthew Gross (who headed internet operations for Howard Dean's 2004 campaign) in his book Cashing in with Content.

See also
Draft (politics)
Draft Bloomberg movement
Draft Condi movement

References

External links
Draft Mark Warner for President
Young Americans for Warner
Draft Mark Warner Blog

Warner
Democratic Party (United States) organizations
United States political action committees
Mark Warner